Los Hatillos is a corregimiento in San Francisco District, Veraguas Province, Panama with a population of 1,365 as of 2010. Its population as of 1990 was 1,472; its population as of 2000 was 1,442.

References

Corregimientos of Veraguas Province